The 1971 season was the Minnesota Vikings' 11th in the National Football League (NFL). They finished with an 11–3 record to win the NFC Central title and return to the playoffs for the fourth consecutive season; however, they lost 20–12 at home to the eventual Super Bowl champion Dallas Cowboys in the divisional round.

In 2007, ESPN.com ranked the 1971 Vikings as the fourth-greatest defense in NFL history, saying, "Considering that their motto was 'Meet at the quarterback,' it's no surprise that the Purple People Eaters held opposing QBs to a 40.4 rating, one of the lowest ever." ESPN also noted that the 1971 Vikings "shut out three opponents, and only one team scored more than 20 points against them. As a result, Alan Page became the first defensive player to ever be named NFL MVP. Carl Eller, Jim Marshall and safety Paul Krause joined Page on the All-Pro team."

Offseason

1971 Draft

 The Vikings traded their second- and sixth-round selections (50th and 154th overall), their 1972 third-round selection (76th overall) and OL Steve Smith to the Philadelphia Eagles in exchange for QB Norm Snead.
 The Vikings traded their fifth-round selection (128th overall) to the Pittsburgh Steelers in exchange for QB Kent Nix.
 The Vikings originally chose 206th overall, but passed, allowing Dallas and Baltimore to move up before the Vikings eventually took the 208th overall pick.
 The Vikings originally chose 414th overall, but moved up to the 413th overall selection when San Francisco passed.
 The Vikings originally chose 440th overall, but moved up to the 439th overall selection when Oakland passed on the 435th overall selection and allowed Los Angeles, Detroit, Miami, San Francisco, Minnesota, Dallas, and Baltimore to move up.

Roster

Preseason

Regular season

Schedule

Game summaries

Week 6: vs. Baltimore Colts

Standings

Postseason

Awards, records, and honors

All-Pros
First team
OT Ron Yary (AP, NEA, PFWA, PFW)
DE Carl Eller (AP, NEA, PFWA, PFW)
DT Alan Page (AP, NEA, PFWA, PFW)
S Paul Krause (NEA)

Pro Bowlers
WR Bob Grim
OT Ron Yary
DE Carl Eller
DT Alan Page
S Paul Krause

League leaders
Bob Lee – Most punts (89), most punting yards (3515)
Charlie West – Longest interception return (89 yards)
Alan Page – Most safeties (2)

Statistics

Team leaders

League rankings

References

1971
Minnesota
NFC Central championship seasons
Minnesota Vikings